Tisis asterias is a moth in the family Lecithoceridae. It was described by Kyu-Tek Park in 2003. It is found in Thailand.

The wingspan is about 17 mm for males and 15 mm for females. The forewings are brownish orange, speckled with dark brown scales throughout and with a large, pale orange semi-ovate area well presented pre-apically, bordered by greyish-brown scales anteriorly, with two or three dark brown spots on the inner side. The termen is slightly oblique, with the fringes dark brown, relatively short on the termen, longer on the inner margin.

Etymology
The species name refers to the shape of the signum and is derived from Latin aster (meaning star).

References

Moths described in 2003
Tisis